A jack is a flag flown from a short jackstaff at the bow (front) of a vessel, while the ensign is flown on the stern (rear).  Jacks on bowsprits or foremasts appeared in the 17th century.  A country may have different jacks for different purposes, especially when (as in the United Kingdom and the Netherlands) the naval jack is forbidden to other vessels.  The United Kingdom has an official civil jack; the Netherlands has several unofficial ones.  In some countries, ships of other government institutions may fly the naval jack, e.g. the ships of the United States Coast Guard and the National Oceanic and Atmospheric Administration in the case of the US jack. Certain organs of the UK's government have their own departmental jacks.  Commercial or pleasure craft may fly the flag of an administrative division (state, province, land) or municipality at the bow.  Merchant ships may fly a house flag.  Yachts may fly a club burgee or officer's flag or the owner's private signal at the bow.  Practice may be regulated by law, custom, or personal judgment.

Etymology
"Jack" occupies 6 pages of the complete second edition of the Oxford English Dictionary and the use of the word in English goes back to the 14th century, appearing as a forename in Piers Plowman.  Quite early on it was used as a name for a peasant or "a man of the lower orders".  It continued the low class connotations in phrases such as "jack tar" for a common seaman, "every man jack," or the use of jack for the knave in cards.  The diminutive form is also seen in "Jack of all trades, master of none", where Jack implies a poor tradesman, possibly not up to journeyman standard.  The term was taken into inanimate objects and denoted a small (or occasionally inferior) component: jack-pit (a small mine shaft), jackplug (single pronged, low current), jack-shaft (intermediate or idler shaft), jack (in bowling: the small ball) or jack-engine (a donkey or barring engine).  Incidentally, a jack is a garment for the upper body (quotes from 1375 onwards), a jacket is derived from this and is a small jack; not the other way around.  As a further example of this usage, in 1686 Robert Plot writing about gins (i.e. horse engines) to pump water out of mines says: "they draw it [the water] up by Gin, which is made bigger, or less ... the less they call a Jack".

As a flag, "jack" followed this usage. A jack flag was a small flag, used to distinguish it from the large ensign or pennants. The OED mentions the theory of its derivation from James I or from a leathern jacket but dismisses both: "neither of these conjectures covers the early use of the word". Originally, the jack would have been flown from the bowsprit topmast head: "You are alsoe for this present service to keepe in yor Jack at yor Boultspritt end" (sailing instructions 1633 as quoted in OED2). By 1692 the jackstaff had been developed to fly the jack: "Jack staff and Jack".

Usage

A naval jack is usually flown when the ship is not under way, but is moored or at anchor, or when it is dressed overall on special occasions. The Union Jack of the Royal Navy must be run up when the first line is ashore when coming alongside. The same regulations are applied by the Royal Canadian Navy.

In the United States, the First Navy Jack is also used as embroidered sleeve patches by the US Navy on its uniforms.

Shapes and designs 
Naval jacks are usually rectangular, often square, and smaller than the national ensign or war flag. Some countries fly a smaller version of the national or war flag, or its canton on its own. France and some other countries use the same flag or ensign for all purposes, civil or military, and also as their naval jack. Japan and some other countries with civil and war ensigns of different designs fly the civil ensign as a jack and the war ensign at the ship's stern. A shortened, square version of the national flag is used by some countries. A larger group of jacks show the country's national coat of arms, either as a banner of arms, or as a badge displayed on the field. Most countries have chosen a completely different design for their naval jacks, often with some national or maritime symbol, and usually with the same colours as in their flags.

War ensign as jack 
Countries that use their war ensign also as a jack, will usually fly a smaller version at the bow.

War flag as jack

Square version of national flag as jack

Canton of national ensign as jack

National coat of arms as jack

National flag as jack

National flag in canton as jack

Jacks of special design

British flag copies

Union jacks 

United or confederated states have in many cases adopted a jack representing their national union. The best known is the Union Jack of the United Kingdom's Royal Navy, composed in 1606 by joining the flags of England and Scotland. When the Kingdom of Ireland merged with Great Britain in 1801, a red saltire (Saint Patrick's Cross) was added to form the present Union Flag. The design of the UK's Union Jack probably inspired later jacks of other states, such as Russia and the Union Jack of Sweden and Norway. The Russian jack in its turn inspired the jacks of Bulgaria, Estonia, and Latvia.

From 1777 to 1975, 1977 to September 2002, and June 2019 to the present, the United States Navy has flown a "union jack", consisting of the blue canton with white stars from the US national ensign. In 1975 and 1976, and then again from September 11, 2002, to June 4, 2019, the US Navy flew the First Navy Jack, allegedly used in 1775 and 1776, with a rattlesnake and the motto "DONT TREAD ON ME" (sic) superimposed on thirteen alternating red and white stripes.

The Confederate States of America followed the same pattern for its first naval jack (1861–1863), using the canton of its first naval ensign, with seven stars forming a circle on a "medium blue" field. Later versions had up to fifteen stars. The second Confederate naval jack was a rectangular cousin of the Confederate army's battle flag and was in use from 1863 until 1865.

The Union Jack of Sweden and Norway (1844–1905) was a rectangular cross flag divided per saltire, combining the national colours of Sweden (hoist and fly) and Norway (top and bottom). The naval jack was also used as a flag for the common diplomatic representations abroad.

See also

 British ensign
 Flag terminology
 Naval ensign
 Vexillology – the study of flags

Notes

References

Further reading
 Album des pavillons nationaux et des marques distinctives. National flags and distinctive markings, Service hydrographique et océanographique de la marine, Brest, 2000

External links 

 FOTW (Flags of the World) website on jacks
 FOTW Dictionary of Vexillology: J (Jack - Jolly Roger)

Types of flags
Jacks (flags)
Maritime flags
Maritime culture